A Cubic Mile of Oil is a 2010 book by Hewitt Crane, Edwin Kinderman, and Ripudaman Malhotra. The title refers to a unit of energy intended to provide a visualizable scale for comparing large amounts of energy. Defined as the energy released by burning a cubic mile of oil, a "CMO" is approximately equal to  joule.
A cubic mile of oil was approximately the world's yearly consumption of oil at the time of the book and the book examines the possible replacements with other sources. For example, it would require building 32,850 wind turbines or 52 nuclear power plants, each year for 50 years, to obtain in one year the amount of energy contained in one cubic mile of oil. In 2022, Visual Capitalist estimated global consumption of oil translated into a cube 1706 meters on a side (or ~6% longer than 1 mile [1609 meters]).

See also

References

External links
 'Doug Englebart's colloquium' Hewitt Crane discusses the state of the world's energy supply
  Ripudaman Malhotra talks about A Cubic Mile of Oil at the University of Toledo.
  Blog for posting updates to A Cubic Mile of Oil.

Energy economics
SRI International
Units of energy